Northwest or Northwestern Division may refer to:

 Northwest Division (NBA), one of the three divisions in the Western Conference of the National Basketball Association
 Northwest Division (NHL), one of two divisions of the National Hockey League's Western Conference
 Northwest Division (RHI), part of the Western Conference of Roller Hockey International
 Northwestern Division, one of the nine divisions of the US Army Corps of Engineers

See also NWD (disambiguation)